Emil Stodola (1862-1945) was a Slovak politician and lawyer. He was founder of the journal Pravny obzor (Law Review), and served as its editor-in-chief.

References

1862 births
1945 deaths
People from Liptovský Mikuláš
Politicians from Bratislava
20th-century Slovak lawyers
Czechoslovak lawyers